Myron Elmer Fuller (June 4, 1889 – August 31, 1949) was an American football player and coach.

Playing career
Fuller played football at Yale University in 1910 and graduated from the school in 1911.

Coaching career
He served as the head coach at Stevens Institute of Technology (1912–1913) Colby College (1914–1915), Haverford School (1916), the University of North Carolina at Chapel Hill (1920), and Tulane University (1921).  He later served as a line coach for the Yale Bulldogs. His 1914 Colby team is considered to be one of the strongest college teams ever in the state of Maine. Colby defeated their opponents by a combined score of 277 to 49, swept in-state rivals Maine, Bowdoin, and Bates, beat Holy Cross 17 to 0, and nearly upset Navy in a 31 to 21 game.

Later life and death
Fuller left coaching after 1927 to pursue a career in industrial engineering.  He died of a heart attack at his home in Mountain Lakes, New Jersey on August 31, 1949 at the age of 60.

Head coaching record

College

References

External links
 

1889 births
1949 deaths
American football guards
American football tackles
Colby Mules football coaches
North Carolina Tar Heels football coaches
Stevens Tech Ducks football coaches
Swarthmore Garnet Tide football coaches
Tulane Green Wave football coaches
West Virginia Mountaineers football coaches
Yale Bulldogs football coaches
Yale Bulldogs football players
High school football coaches in Pennsylvania
Sportspeople from Boston
Players of American football from Boston